The Somaliland National Service Programme is the National Service Program in Somaliland which is an agency of the Government of Somaliland agency with a legal personality currently under the office of President. SNSP is a pilot programme and its performance and contribution to the national youth well-being.

See also

Somaliland

References

External links
 Official Website
2018 establishments in Somaliland